Bobot is a language of the island of Seram, Indonesia.

References

Central Maluku languages
Languages of Indonesia
Seram Island